The Gen. Joseph B. Palmer House is a historic house in Murfreesboro, Tennessee, U.S.. It was built in 1867-1869 for Joseph B. Palmer, who served as a general in the Confederate States Army during the American Civil War of 1861–1865. It was designed in the Italianate architectural style. It has been listed on the National Register of Historic Places since September 20, 1973.

References

Houses on the National Register of Historic Places in Tennessee
Houses completed in 1869
Buildings and structures in Murfreesboro, Tennessee